The women's tournament of rugby sevens at the 2013 Summer Universiade was held from July 14 to 17 in Kazan, Russia.

Preliminary round

Group A

Group B

Classification

9th-place game

Elimination round
The elimination round will be split into three tiers: in descending order, the medal, plate, and bowl tiers. The top four finishers of each group in the preliminary round will move on to the medal tier of the elimination round for a chance to compete for medals, while the remaining two teams will play a classification game. The losers of the medal tier quarterfinals will play in the plate tier, and the losers of the plate tier semifinals will play in the bowl tier final.

Bowl tier

Final

Plate tier

Semifinals

Final

Medal tier

Quarterfinals

Semifinals

Bronze-medal match

Gold-medal match

Final standings

References

Women